Mohammed or Mohamed Salem may refer to:

 Mohammed Salem Al-Enazi (born 1976), Qatari footballer
 Mohammed Salem Saleh (born 1982), Emirati footballer
 Mohammed Salem (footballer, born 1985), Saudi footballer
 Mohamed Salem (footballer, born 1940) (1940–2008), Algerian footballer
 Mohamed Salem (footballer, born 1994), Egyptian footballer
 Mohamad Salem (born 1995), Lebanese footballer